Pangasinan, officially the Province of Pangasinan, is a coastal province in the Philippines located in the Ilocos Region of Luzon. Its capital is Lingayen. Pangasinan is in the western area of Luzon along Lingayen Gulf and the South China Sea. According to the 2020 census it has a population of 3,163,190. The official number of registered voters in Pangasinan is 1,651,814. The western portion of the province is part of the homeland of the Sambal people, while the central and eastern portions are the homeland of the Pangasinan people. Due to ethnic migration, the Ilocano people settled in the province.

Pangasinan is the name of the province, the people and the spoken language. Indigenous Pangasinan speakers are estimated to number at least 2 million. The Pangasinan language, which is official in the province, is one of the officially recognized regional languages in the Philippines. In Pangasinan there were several ethnic groups that enriched the cultural fabric of the province. Almost all of the people are Pangasinans and the rest are descendants of Bolinao and Ilocano that settled the eastern and western parts of the province. Pangasinan is spoken as a second-language by many of the ethnic minorities in Pangasinan. The secondary ethnic groups are the Bolinao-speaking Zambals, and Ilocanos.

The name Pangasinan means "place of salt" or "place of salt-making"; it is derived from the prefix pang, meaning "for", the root word asin, meaning "salt”, and suffix an, signifying "location". The Spanish form of the province's name, Pangasinán, remains predominant, albeit without diacritics and so does its pronunciation: . The province is a major producer of salt in the Philippines. Its major products include bagoong ("salted-krill") and alamang ("shrimp-paste").

Pangasinan was founded by Austronesian peoples who called themselves Anakbanwa circa 2500 BCE. A kingdom called Luyag na Caboloan which expanded to incorporate much of northwestern Luzon existed in Pangasinan before the Spanish conquest in the 16th century. The Kingdom of Luyag na Kaboloan was known as the Wangdom of Pangasinan in Chinese records. The ancient Pangasinan people were skilled navigators and the maritime trade network that once flourished in ancient Luzon connected Pangasinan with other peoples of Southeast Asia, India, China, Japan and the rest of the Pacific. The ancient kingdom of Luyag na Caboloan was in fact mentioned in Chinese and Indian records as being an important kingdom on ancient trade routes.

Popular tourist attractions in Pangasinan include the Hundred Islands National Park in Alaminos the white-sand beaches of Bolinao and Dasol. Dagupan is known for its Bangus Festival ("Milkfish Festival"). Pangasinan is also known for its mangoes and ceramic oven-baked Calasiao puto ("native rice cake"). Pangasinan occupies a strategic geo-political position in the central plain of Luzon. Pangasinan has been described as the gateway to northern Luzon.

History

Ancient history
The Pangasinan people, like most of the people in the Malay Archipelago, are descendants of the Austronesian-speakers who settled in Southeast Asia in prehistoric times. Comparative genetics, linguistics and archaeological studies locate the origin of the Austronesian languages in Sundaland which was populated as early as 50,000 years ago by modern humans. The Pangasinan language is one of many languages that belongs to the Malayo-Polynesian languages branch of the Austronesian languages family.

Southeast Asian maritime trade network
A vast maritime trade network connected the distant Austronesian settlements in Southeast Asia, the Pacific and the Indian Ocean. The Pangasinan people were part of this ancient Austronesian civilization.

The ancient Austronesian-speakers were expert navigators. Their outrigger canoes and sailboats were capable of crossing the distant seas. The Malagasy sailed from the Malay archipelago to Madagascar and possibly reached Africa. As the possible predecessors of the Polynesians, large seagoing canoes called "bangka" ("vaka" in several Polynesian dialects and "waka" in Maori) were first developed by Austronesians in the Philippine archipelago. Bangka were used to establish long-distance trade networks with Pacific islands from the Micronesian island nations of Guam and Palau, as far away as Hawaii and Easter Island and possibly the Pacific coastline of the Americas. Proof of these trade exchanges are the prevalence of "kumara" or sweet potato in the Pacific Islands which is endemic to South America and the abundance of chicken bones in ancient South American archaeological dig sites whose closest genetic relatives are those of chickens from Asia. At least three hundred years before the arrival of Europeans the Makasar and the Bugis from Sulawesi as well as the Sama-Bajaus of the Malay Archipelago carried out long-distance commerce with their prau or paraw ("sailboat") establishing settlements in north Australia which they called Marege.

Pangasinan was founded by Austronesian peoples who called themselves Anakbanwa during the Austronesian expansion from Taiwan and Southern China circa 5000–2500 BCE or the Austronesian dispersal from Sundaland at least 7,000 years after the last Ice Age. Anakbanwa means "child of banwa." Banwa (also spelled banua or vanua) is an Austronesian concept that could mean territory, homeland, habitat, society, civilization or cosmos. The Pangasinan people identified or associated banwa with the sun which was their symbol for their banwa. The Pangasinan people are closely related to the Ibaloi in the neighboring province of Benguet and other peoples of Luzon. The Anakbanwa established their settlements on the banks of the Agno River and the coasts of Lingayen Gulf. The coastal area came to be known as Pangasinan and the interior area came to be known as Kaboloan. Eventually the  people and the language came to be known as Pangasinan. Archaeological evidence as well as early Chinese and Indian records show that the inhabitants of Pangasinan traded with India, Arabia, China and Japan as early as the 8th century CE.

Wangdom of Pangasinan (Luyag na Caboloan)
The Wangdom of Pangasinan (as known in Chinese records), known locally as the ancient kingdom of Luyag na Caboloan (also spelled Kaboloan), was located in the fertile Agno River valley with its capital in Binalatongan. Around the same period the Srivijaya and Majapahit empires arose in Indonesia and extended their influence to much of the Malay Archipelago. Urduja/Udaya, a legendary woman warrior who Ibn Battuta called a rival of the Mongol Empire, is believed to have ruled in Pangasinan around the 14th century. The Luyag na Caboloan expanded the territory and influence of Pangasinan to what are now the neighboring provinces of Tarlac, La Union, Zambales, Nueva Ecija, Aurora (province), Quirino, and Benguet. Pangasinan enjoyed full independence until the Spanish conquest.

Spanish accounts of pre-Hispanic Pangasinan
In the sixteenth-century Pangasinan was called the "Port of Japan" by the Spanish. The locals wore native apparel typical of other maritime Southeast Asian ethnic groups in addition to Japanese and Chinese silks. Even common people were clad in Chinese and Japanese cotton garments. They blackened their teeth and were disgusted by the white teeth of foreigners which were likened to that of animals. They used porcelain jars typical of Japanese and Chinese households. Japanese-style gunpowder weapons were encountered in naval battles in the area. In exchange for these goods traders from all over Asia would come to trade primarily for gold and slaves but also deerskins, civet and other local products. Other than a notably more extensive trade network with Japan and China they were culturally similar to other Luzon groups to the south.

Pangasinans were also described as a warlike people who were known for their resistance to Spanish conquest. Bishop Domingo Salazar described Pangasinans as the fiercest and cruelest in the land. They were untouched by Christianity but like Christians they used vintage wine in small quantities for sacramental practices. The church bragged that they, not the Spanish military, won the northern part of the Philippines for Spain. The church was strict with adulterers with the punishment being death for both parties. Pangasinans were known to take defeated Zambal, (Aeta) and Negrito warriors to sell as slaves to Chinese traders.

Christianity
In 1324, Odoric of Pordenone, a Franciscan missionary from Friuli, Italy, is believed by some to have celebrated a Catholic Mass and baptized natives at Bolinao. In July 2007, memorial markers were set up in Bolinao to commemorate Odoric's journey based on a publication by Luigi Malamocco. The 1324 mass would have predated the mass held in 1521 by Ferdinand Magellan which is generally regarded as the first mass in the Philippines by some 197 years. However, historian William Henry Scott concluded after examining Oderic's writings about his travels that he likely never set foot on Philippine soil and if he did there is no reason to think that he celebrated mass.

Spanish colonization
On April 27, 1565, the Spanish conquistador Miguel López de Legazpi arrived in the Philippine islands with about 500 soldiers and established a Spanish settlement. On May 24, 1570, the Spanish forces defeated Rajah Sulayman and other rulers of Manila and later declared Manila as the new capital of the Spanish East Indies. After securing Manila the Spanish forces continued to conquer the rest of the island of Luzon including Pangasinan.

Provincia de Pangasinán
In 1571, the Spanish conquest of Pangasinan began with an expedition by the Spanish conquistador Martín de Goiti who came from the Spanish settlement in Manila through Pampanga. About a year later another Spanish conquistador, Juan de Salcedo, sailed to Lingayen Gulf and landed at the mouth of the Agno River. Limahong, a Chinese pirate, fled to Pangasinan after his fleet was driven away from Manila in 1574. Limahong failed to establish a colony in Pangasinan, as an army led by Juan de Salcedo chased him out of Pangasinan after a seven-month siege.

Pangasinan as a province dates back to an administrative and judicial district, with Lingayen as the capital, as early as 1580 but its territorial boundaries were first delineated in 1611. Lingayen has remained the capital of the province except for a brief period during the revolutionary Era when San Carlos served as temporary administrative headquarters and during the slightly longer Japanese Occupation when Dagupan was the capital.

The province of Pangasinan was formerly classified as an alcaldía mayor de término or first class civil province during the Spanish regime and has remained a first class-A province up to the present day. Its territorial jurisdiction once included most of the entire province of Zambales and portions of what are now Tarlac and La Union provinces.

Rebellion against the Spanish rule

Malong liberation
Andres Malong, a native chief of the town of Binalatongan (now named San Carlos City), liberated the province from Spanish rule in December 1660. The people of Pangasinan proclaimed Andres Malong Ari na Pangasinan ("King of Pangasinan"). Pangasinan armies attempted to liberate the neighboring provinces of Pampanga and Ilocos, but were repelled by a Spanish-led coalition of loyalist tribal warriors and mercenaries. In February 1661, the newly independent Kingdom of Pangasinan fell to the Spanish.

Palaris liberation
On November 3, 1762, the people of Pangasinan proclaimed independence from Spain after a rebellion led by Juan de la Cruz Palaris. The Pangasinan revolt was sparked by news that Manila had fallen to the British on October 6, 1762. The Traité de Paris ended the Seven Years' War between Britain, France and Spain on March 1, 1763. On January 16, 1765, Juan de la Cruz Palaris was captured and Pangasinan independence was lost again.

Philippine revolution against Spain

The Katipunan, a nationalist secret society, was founded on July 7, 1892, with the aim of uniting the peoples of the Philippines in the fight for independence and religious freedom. The Philippine Revolution began on August 26, 1896, and was led by the leader of the Katipunan, Andres Bonifacio. On November 18, 1897, a Katipunan council was formed in western Pangasinan with Presidente Generalisimo Roman Manalang and General Mauro Ortiz. General Emilio Aguinaldo proclaimed Philippine independence on June 12, 1898. Dagupan, the major commercial center of Pangasinan, was surrounded by Katipunan forces on July 18, 1898. The Battle of Dagupan lasted from July 18 to 23 of that year with the surrender of 1,500 Spanish soldiers under Commander Federico J. Ceballos and Governor Joaquin de Orengochea.

The Battle of Dagupan was fought by local Katipuneros under the command of General Francisco Makabulos and the last remnants of the once mighty Spanish Army under General Francisco Ceballos.  Three local heroes fought in the five-day battle, Don Daniel Maramba of Santa Barbara, Don Vicente Prado of San Jacinto and Don Juan Quezada of Dagupan. Their armies amassed in Dagupan making a last stand at the brick-walled Catholic Church.

Maramba led the liberation of the town of Santa Barbara on March 7, 1898, following a signal for simultaneous attack from Makabulos. Hearing that Santa Barbara fell to the rebels Spanish forces in Dagupan attempted to retake the town but were repelled by Maramba's forces. After the setback the Spanish decided to concentrate their forces in Lingayen in order to protect the provincial capital. This allowed Maramba to expand his operations to include Malasiqui, Urdaneta and Mapandan which he defeated in succession. He then defeated the town of Mangaldan before proceeding to the last Spanish garrison in Dagupan. On March 7, 1898, rebels under the command of Prado and Quesada attacked convents in the province of Zambales which now constitute western Pangasinan.

Attacked and brought under Filipino control were Alaminos, Agno, Anda, Alos, Bani, Balincaguin, Bolinao, Dasol, Eguia and Potot. The revolt then spread to Labrador, Sual, Salasa and many other towns in the west. The towns of Sual, Labrador, Lingayen, Salasa and Bayambang were occupied first by the forces of Prado and Quesada before they attacked Dagupan.

On April 17, 1898, General Makabulos appointed Prado to politico-military governor of Pangasinan with Quesada as his second in command. In May 1898 General Emilio Aguinaldo returned from his exile in Hong Kong following the signing of the Pact of Biac-na-Bato in December 1897. Aguinaldo's return gave renewed the flames of the revolution. On June 3, 1898, General Makabulos entered Tarlac.

So successful were the Filipinos in their many pitched battles against the Spanish that on June 30, 1898, Spanish authorities decided to evacuate all forces to Dagupan for a last stand against the rebels. They were ordered to go to Dagupan were all civilian and military personnel, including members of the volunteer locales of towns not yet in rebel hands. Those who heeded this order were the volunteer forces of Mangaldan, San Jacinto, Pozorrubio, Manaoag, and Villasis. Among the items brought to Dagupan was the image of the Most Holy Rosary of the Virgin of Manaoag which was the patron saint of Pangasinan.

The siege began when the forces of Maramba and Prado converged in Dagupan on July 18, 1898. The arrival of General Makabulos strengthened the rebel forces until the Spanish, holed up inside the Catholic Church, waved the flag of surrender five days later. The poorly armed Filipinos were no match for the Spanish soldiers holed inside the Church.  The tempo of battle changed when the attackers under the command of Don Vicente Prado devised a crude means of protection to shield them from Spanish fire while advancing. They used trunks of bananas bundled up in sawali which enabled them to move upon the Church.

Northern Zambales ceded to Pangasinan

On November 30, 1903, several municipalities from northern Zambales including Agno, Alaminos, Anda, Bani, Bolinao, Burgos, Dasol, Infanta and Mabini were ceded to Pangasinan by the American colonial government. These municipalities were a part of the homeland of the Sambal people who wanted to remain within the Zambales province. This 1903 colonial decision has yet to be reverted.

American colonization and the Philippine Commonwealth regime
Pangasinan and other parts of the Spanish East Indies were ceded to the Americans after the Treaty of Paris, which ended the Spanish–American War. During the Philippine–American War Lieutenant Col. José Torres Bugallón of Salasa fought together with Gen. Antonio Luna to defend the First Philippine Republic against American colonization in Northern Luzon. Bugallon was killed in battle on February 5, 1899. The First Philippine Republic was abolished in 1901. In 1907 the Philippine Assembly was established and for the first time five residents of Pangasinan were elected as its district representatives. In 1921, Mauro Navarro, representing Pangasinan in the Philippine Assembly, sponsored a law to rename the town of Salasa to Bugallon in  honor of General Bugallon.

Manuel L. Quezon was inaugurated as the first president of the Commonwealth of the Philippines with collaboration from the United States of America on November 15, 1935.

The 21st Infantry Division were stationed in Pangasinan during the pre-World War II era. Anti-Japanese Imperial military operations included the fall of Bataan and Corregidor along with aiding the USAFFE ground force from January to May 1942 and the Japanese Insurgencies and Allied Liberation in Pangasinan from 1942 to 1945.

Philippine Republic

1946–1986
After the declaration of Independence on July 4, 1946, Eugenio Perez, a Liberal Party congressman representing the fourth district of Pangasinan, was elected Speaker of the lower Legislative House. He led the House until 1953 when the Nacionalista Party became the dominant party.

Pangasinan, which is historically and geographically part of the Central Luzon Region, is made politically part of the Ilocos Region (Region I) in the gerrymandering of the Philippines by Ferdinand Marcos, despite the fact that Pangasinan has its distinct primary language, which is Pangasinan. The political classification of Pangasinan as part of the Ilocos Region has generated confusion among some Filipinos. The residents of Pangasinan are Ilocanos even though Ilocanos constitute a minority in the province. Pangasinan is an ethnic group with a distinct language and culture. Its economy is larger than the Ilocano provinces of Ilocos Norte, Ilocos Sur and La Union and its population is more than 50 percent of the population of Region 1.

1986–present
In February 1986 Vice Chief of Staff General Fidel V. Ramos, head of the Philippine Integrated National Police and a native of Pangasinan, became an instrumental figure in the EDSA people power revolution which deposed President Ferdinand Marcos.

After the downfall of Marcos all local government unit executives were ordered by President Corazon Aquino to vacate their posts. Some local executives were ordered to return to their seats as in the case of Mayor Ludovico Espinosa of Dasol who claimed to have joined UNIDO during the height of the EDSA Revolution. Fidel Ramos was appointed as AFP Chief of Staff and later as Defense Secretary replacing Juan Ponce Enrile. Oscar Orbos, a congressman from Bani, was appointed by Aquino to head the Department of Transportation and Communications and later to Executive Secretary.

On May 11, 1992, Fidel V. Ramos ran for President. He became the first Pangasinense President of the Philippines. Under his leadership the Philippines recovered from the oil and power crisis of 1991. His influence sparked the economic growth of Pangasinan when it hosted the 1995 Palarong Pambansa (Philippine National Games).

Jose de Venecia, who represented the same district as Eugenio Perez, was the second Pangasinense to become Speaker of the House of Representatives in 1992. He was reelected again in 1995. De Venecia was selected by the Ramos' administration party Lakas NUCD to be its presidential candidate in 1998. De Venecia ran but lost to Vice President Joseph Estrada. Oscar Orbos ran for vice president but lost to Senator Gloria Macapagal Arroyo, whose mother, former First Lady Evangelina Macaraeg-Macapagal, hails from Binalonan.

Arroyo ascended to the presidency after the second EDSA Revolution when President Joseph Estrada was overthrown.

In May 2004 actor-turned-politician Fernando Poe, Jr. of San Carlos City ran for president against incumbent Gloria Macapagal Arroyo. The Pangasinan vote was split by the two presidential candidates, both with Pangasinan roots. Arroyo was elected president but her victory was tainted by charges of electoral fraud and vote-buying.

Geography

Physical
Pangasinan is located in the west central area of Luzon in the Philippines. It is bordered by La Union to the north, Benguet and Nueva Vizcaya to the northeast, Nueva Ecija to the southeast, and Zambales and Tarlac to the south. To the west of Pangasinan is the South China Sea. The province also encloses Lingayen Gulf.

At the coast of Alaminos, the Hundred islands have become a famous tourist spot.

The terrain of the province, as part of the Central Luzon plains, is typically flat, with a few parts being hilly and/or mountainous. The northeastern municipalities of San Manuel, San Nicolas, Natividad, San Quintin and Umingan have hilly to mountainous areas at the tip of the Cordillera mountains. The Zambales mountains extend to the province's western towns of Labrador, Mabini, Bugallon, Aguilar, Mangatarem, Dasol, and Infanta forming the mountainous portions of those towns.

The Philippine Institute of Volcanology and Seismology (PHIVOLCS) reported several inactive volcanoes in the province: Amorong, Balungao, Cabaluyan, Cahelietan, Candong, and Malabobo. PHIVOLCS reported no active or potentially active volcanoes in Pangasinan. A caldera-like landform is located between the towns of Malasiqui and Villasis with a center at about 15° 55′ N and 120° 30′ E near the Cabaruan Hills.

Several rivers traverse the province. The longest is the Agno River which originates in the Cordillera Mountains of Benguet and eventually terminates at Lingayen Gulf. Other major rivers include the Bued River, Angalacan River, Sinocalan River, Patalan River and the Cayanga River.

Administrative divisions

The province of Pangasinan is subdivided into 44 municipalities, 4 cities, and 1,364 barangay (which means "village" or "community"). There are six congressional districts in the province.

The capital of the province is Lingayen. In ancient times, the capital of Pangasinan was Binalatongan, now San Carlos. During Japanese occupation, Dagupan was made a wartime capital.

Independent city
 Dagupan

Component cities
Alaminos
San Carlos
Urdaneta

Municipalities

Agno
Aguilar
Alcala
Anda
Asingan
Balungao
Bani
Basista
Bautista
Bayambang
Binalonan
Binmaley
Bolinao
Bugallon
Burgos
Calasiao
Dasol
Infanta
Labrador
Laoac
Lingayen
Mabini
Malasiqui
Manaoag
Mangaldan
Mangatarem
Mapandan
Natividad
Pozorrubio
Rosales
San Fabian
San Jacinto
San Manuel
San Nicolas
San Quintin
Santa Barbara
Santa Maria
Santo Tomas
Sison
Sual
Tayug
Umingan
Urbiztondo
Villasis

Barangays
Pangasinan has 1,364 barangays comprising its 44 municipalities and 4 cities, ranking the province at 3rd with the most barangays in a Philippine province, only behind the Visayan provinces of Leyte and Iloilo.

Longos Amangonan Parac‑Parac Fabrica is the longest named barangay in the Philippines.  It is situated in the municipality of San Fabian, Pangasinan. The most populous barangay in the province is Bonuan Gueset in Dagupan with a population of 22,042 as of 2010. If cities are excluded, Poblacion in the municipality of Lingayen has the highest population at 12,642. Iton in Bayambang has the lowest with only 99 as of the 2010 census.

Demographics

Population

The Pangasinan people (Totoon Pangasinan) are called Pangasinan or the Hispanicized name Pangasinense, or simply taga-Pangasinan, which means "native of Pangasinan". Pangasinan people were known as traders, businesspeople, farmers and fishers. Pangasinan is the third most-populated province in the Philippines. The estimated population of the indigenous speakers of the Pangasinan language in the province of Pangasinan is almost 2 million and is projected to double in about 30 years. According to the 2000 census 47 percent of the population are native Pangasinan and 44 percent are Ilocano settlers. Indigenous Sambal people predominate in the westernmost municipalities of Bolinao and Anda. The Pangasinan people are closely related to the Austronesian-speaking peoples of the Philippines as well as Indonesia and Malaysia.

Languages

The Pangasinan language is an agglutinative language. It belongs to the Malayo-Polynesian languages branch of the Austronesian language family and is the primary language of the province of Pangasinan, as well as northern Tarlac and southwestern La Union. The Pangasinan language is similar to the other Malayo-Polynesian languages of the Philippines, as well as Indonesia and Malaysia. It is closely related to the Ibaloi language spoken in the neighboring province of Benguet, located northwest of Pangasinan. The Pangasinan language along with Ibaloi are classified under the Pangasinic group of languages. The other Pangasinic languages are:
 Karao
 Iwaak
 Keley-I
 I-Kallahan
 Ibaloi
 Tinoc
 Kayapa

Aside from their native language, many educated Pangasinans are highly proficient in Ilocano, English and Filipino. Pangasinan is mostly spoken in the central part of the province in the 2nd, 3rd, 4th, and is the second language in other parts of Pangasinan. Ilocano is widely spoken in the westernmost and easternmost parts of Pangasinan in the 1st, 5th and 6th districts, and is the second language in other parts of Pangasinan. Ilocanos and Pangasinans speak Ilocano with a Pangasinan accent, as descendants of Ilocanos from first generation who lived within Pangasinan population learned Pangasinan language. Bolinao, a Sambalic language is widely spoken in the western tip of the province in the towns of Bolinao and Anda.

Religion
The dominant religion in Pangasinan is Roman Catholicism with 80% affiliation in the population. The Aglipayan Church comes in second with 15% of the population. Other religious denominations are divided with other Christian groups such as Members Church of God International, Iglesia Ni Cristo, Baptist, Methodist, The Church of Jesus Christ of Latter-day Saints, Jehovah's Witnesses and Seventh-day Adventist. Few are strict believers and continue to practice their indigenous anito beliefs and rituals, like most of the people of the Philippines.

Spanish and American missionaries introduced Christianity to Pangasinan. Prior to the Spanish conquest in 1571, the predominant religion of the people of Pangasinan was similar to the indigenous religion of the highland Igorot or the inhabitants of the Cordillera Administrative Region on the island of Luzon, who mostly retained their indigenous culture and religion. A translation of the New Testament (excluding Revelation) in the Pangasinan language by Fr. Nicolas Manrique Alonzo Lallave, a Spanish Dominican friar assigned in Urdaneta, was the first ever translation of a complete portion of the Bible in a Philippine language. Pangasinan was also influenced by Hinduism, Buddhism and Islam to a lesser extent before the introduction of Christianity. Some Pangasinense people have reverted to their indigenous religion of worshiping Ama Kaoley or Ama-Gaolay, while the Sambal people of the west have reverted to their indigenous religion worshiping Malayari.

Economy

The province's economy is mainly agricultural due to its vast fertile plains. More than 44 percent of its agricultural area is devoted to crop production. Aside from being one of the Philippine's rice granaries, Pangasinan is also a major producer of coconut, mango and eggplant. Pangasinan is the richest province in the Ilocos Region.

Energy
The 1200 megawatt Sual coal-fired power plant and 345 megawatt San Roque multi-purpose dam in the municipalities of Sual and San Manuel, respectively, are the primary sources of energy in the province.

Marine
Pangasinan is a major fish supplier in Luzon and a major producer of salt in the Philippines. It has extensive fishponds mostly for raising bangus or "milkfish" along the coasts of Lingayen Gulf and the South China Sea. Pangasinan's aquaculture includes oyster and sea urchin farms.

Salt is also a major industry. In salt evaporation ponds seawater is mixed with sodium bicarbonate until the water evaporates and the salt remains. This is their ancient tradition inspired from Egypt.

Agriculture
The major crops in Pangasinan are rice, mangoes, corn, and sugar cane. Pangasinan has a land area of 536,819 hectares, and 44 percent of the total land area of Pangasinan is devoted to agricultural production.

Financial
Pangasinan has 593 banking and financing institutions.

Health and education
There are thousands of public schools and hundreds of private schools across the province for primary and secondary education. Many Pangasinans go to Metro Manila, Baguio, and the United States for tertiary and higher education.

Pangasinan has 51 hospitals and clinics and 68 rural health units (as of July 2002). Although some residents go to other parts of the Philippines, Metro Manila, Europe and the United States for extensive medical tests and treatment, almost all Pangasinans go to the major medical centers in the cities of Dagupan, San Carlos and Urdaneta.

Culture
The culture of Pangasinan is a blend of the indigenous Malayo-Polynesian and western Hispanic culture with some Indian and Chinese influences as well as American influences. Pangasinan is westernized yet retains a strong native Austronesian background.

The main centers of Pangasinan culture are Dagupan, Lingayen, Manaoag, Calasiao and San Carlos City.

Government

The incumbent governor of Pangasinan is Ramon Guico III along with Vice Governor Mark Lambino, son of Cagayan Economic Zone Authority (CEZA) and Presidential Adviser for Northern Luzon Raul Lambino. Among prominent figures who served as Governor of Pangasinan include Francisco Duque Jr., former Secretary of Department of Health (Philippines), Conrado Estrella, former secretary of Department of Agrarian Reform, Tito Primicias, Vicente Millora, Daniel Maramba, Oscar Orbos, Victor Agbayani and Amado Espino Jr.

Here are the other newly elected officials beginning June 30, 2022:

District Representatives 
 1st District: Arthur Celeste
 2nd District: Mark Cojuangco
 3rd District: Rachel Arenas
 4th District: Christopher de Venecia
 5th District: Ramon Guico Jr.
 6th District: Marlyn Primicias-Agabas

Provincial Board Members  
 1st District: Napoleon Fontelera Jr. and Apolonia Bacay
 2nd District: Philip Theodore Cruz and Haidee Pacheco
 3rd District: Shiela Baniqued and Vici Ventenilla 
 4th District: Marinor de Guzman and Jerry Rosario
 5th District: Chinky Perez-Tababa and Louie Sison
 6th District: Noel Bince and Salvador Perez Jr.
 Liga ng mga Barangay Provincial President: TBA
 PCL Pangasinan President: TBA
 Sangguniang Kabataan Provincial President: TBA

Notable people

Notable people either born or residing in Pangasinan include:

 José Torres Bugallón, Filipino military officer who fought during the Philippine Revolution and the Philippine–American War, from Bugallon.
 Carmen Velasquez, National Scientist of the Philippines for Parasitology, from Bayambang.
 Perla Santos-Ocampo, National Scientist of the Philippines for Pediatrics, from Dagupan.
 Francisco Sionil José, National Artist of the Philippines for Literature, from Rosales.
 Victorio Edades, National Artist of the Philippines for Visual Arts– Painting, from Dagupan.
 Salvador Bernal, National Artist of the Philippines for Theater and Design, from Dagupan.
 President Fidel V. Ramos, who was born in Lingayen and hails from Asingan.
 Narciso Ramos, a journalist, lawyer, assemblyman and ambassador, and one of the founding fathers of the ASEAN (Association of Southeast Asian Nations), born in Asingan.
 Manuel Moran, 7th Chief Justice of the Supreme Court of the Philippines, who was born in Binalonan.
 Jhosep Lopez, 190th Associate Justice of the Supreme Court of the Philippines, born in Umingan
 Senator Geronima Tomelden-Pecson, the first female senator of the Philippines, was a native of Lingayen.
 Senator Pedro María Sison, delegate to the Philippine Constitutional Convention of 1935, from Urdaneta.
 Senator Cipriano Primicias Sr., from Alcala
 Senator Leticia Ramos-Shahani (Senator of the Philippines, 1987–1998), born in Lingayen and hails from Asingan.
 Senator Ambrosio Padilla, vice-president of the Philippine Constitutional Commission of 1986, born in Lingayen.
 Senator Rene Cayetano (Senator of the Philippines, 1998–2003), from San Carlos City.
 Speaker Eugenio Perez, 8th Speaker of the House of Representatives (Philippines) from Pangasinan, born in Basista.
 Speaker Jose de Venecia Jr., 17th Speaker of the House of Representatives (Philippines), born in Dagupan.
 Conrado Estrella III, House Representative for the Abono Partylist, former 6th District Representative of Pangasinan (1987-1995; 2001-2010)
 Deputy Speaker Rose Marie Arenas noted socialite and philanthropist 
Maria Rachel Arenas former Movie and Television Review and Classification Board  Chairman and first woman representative of Pangasinan 
 Eva Macapagal, First Lady of the Philippines in 1961–1965 and mother of Former President Gloria Macapagal Arroyo, from Binalonan.
 Jacqueline Aquino Siapno, a professor from Dagupan, former interim first lady of East Timor.
 Gabriel C. Singson, the former governor of the Bangko Sentral ng Pilipinas, from Lingayen.
 Hermogenes Esperon Jr., Former AFP Chief of Staff and current adviser of National Security Council (Philippines), born in Asingan.
 Arturo Lomibao, 11th Chief of the Philippine National Police, from  Mangaldan
 Edward Soriano, retired United States lieutenant general and is the highest-ranking Filipino American officer to have served in the United States military, and the first promoted to a general officer., from Alcala
 Romeo de la Cruz, former Solicitor General of the Philippines from Urdaneta City.
 Thomas Orbos, current undersecretary of Department of Transportation (Philippines), brother of former Governor Oscar Orbos, natives from the town of Bani.
 Oscar Orbos, a native of Bani, a former governor and TV host.
 Carlos Bulosan, author of America Is in the Heart, from Binalonan.
 Larry Itliong,  Filipino-American labor organizer, from San Nicholas.
 Ermin Garcia, journalist and newspaper publisher, from San Fabian
 Julius Babao, ABS-CBN news anchor, TV/Radio host, born in Dagupan.
 Cheryl Cosim, TV5 news anchor, TV/Radio host is from Dagupan.
 Maki Pulido, GMA news anchor, hails from Anda.
 Carmen Rosales, Filipina actress and World War II guerilla fighter, born in Rosales.
 Fernando Poe Sr., former action star, from San Carlos City.
 Barbara Perez, veteran actress, born in Urdaneta City.
 Lolita Rodriguez, actress, born in Urdaneta City.
 Gloria Romero, a veteran actress, hails from Mabini.
 Nova Villa, GMA veteran actress, from Mangatarem
 Mitoy Yonting, first winner of The Voice of the Philippines, lead singer Draybers., from Calasiao.
 Papa Jack, TV Radio Broadcaster and DJ, from Alcala.
 Mocha Uson, Assistant Secretary of Presidential Communications Operations Office (PCOO), born in Dagupan.
 Jhong Hilario, ABS-CBN dancer and actor, born in Asingan.
 Jane Oineza, ABS-CBN Teen Actress from Bani.
 Danny Ildefonso, two-time PBA Season MVP, five-time Best Player of the Conference, three-time Finals MVP, All-Star Game MVP, Rookie of the Year, Comeback Player of the Year, eight-time PBA Champion and one of the 40 Greatest Players in PBA History, from Urdaneta City.
 Marc Pingris, two-time Finals MVP, three-time Defensive Player of the Year, All-Star Game MVP, Most Improved Player, eight-time PBA Champion and one of the 40 Greatest Players in PBA History, from Pozorrubio
 Marlou Aquino, Rookie of the Year, Best Player of the Conference, Defensive Player of the Year, three-time PBA Champion and one of the 40 Greatest Players in PBA History, from Santa Barbara.
Rachel Alejandro, opm singer and actress, from Alaminos.
Lordy Tugade, Finals MVP and PBA Champion, from Alaminos.
Niña Jose, ABS-CBN actress, politician, mayor of Bayambang, from Bayambang.

See also

Pangasinan literature
Roman Catholic Archdiocese of Lingayen-Dagupan
Roman Catholic Diocese of Alaminos
Roman Catholic Diocese of Urdaneta

References

Bibliography
  Agoncillo, Teodoro A. History of the Filipino People.  (Quezon City:  Garotech Publishing, Eighth Edition, 1990).
  Cortes, Rosario Mendoza. Pangasinan, 1572–1800. (Quezon City:  University of the Philippines Press, 1974; New Day Publishers, 1975).
  Cortes, Rosario Mendoza. Pangasinan, 1801–1900:  The Beginnings of Modernization.  (Cellar Book Shop, April 1991).
  Cortes, Rosario Mendoza. Pangasinan, 1901–1986:  A Political, Socioeconomic, and Cultural History.  (Cellar Book Shop, April 1991).
  Cortes, Rosario Mendoza. The Filipino Saga:  History as Social Change.  (Quezon City:  New Day Publishers, 2000).
  Craig, Austin. "Lineage Life and Labors of Jose Rizal". (Manila: Philippine Education Company, 1913).
  Mafiles, Victoria Veloria; Nava, Erlinda Tomelden.  The English Translations of Pangasinan Folk Literature.  (Dagupan, Philippines:  Five Ed Printing Press, 2004).
  Quintos, Felipe Quintos. Sipi Awaray Gelew Diad Pilipinas (Revolucion Filipina). (Lingayen, Pangasinan:  Gumawid Press, 1926).
  Samson-Nelmida, Perla.  Pangasinan Folk Literature,  A Doctoral Dissertation.  (University of the Philippines, Diliman, Quezon City:  May 1982).

External links

 
 Official Tourism Website of Pangasinan
 Official Website of the Provincial Government of Pangasinan
 Provincial Profile at the National Competitiveness Council of the Philippines
 Local Governance Performance Management System
 Pangasinan Wikipedia
 Salt production in Pangasinan
 Philippine Standard Geographic Code
 Philippine Census Information

 
Provinces of the Philippines
Provinces of the Ilocos Region
States and territories established in 1611
1611 establishments in the Philippines